Sou Tout Apwe Fete Fini  (Creole for Drunk After the Party Finishes) was a political party in Saint Lucia. Led by TV host Chris Hunte, it contested five seats in the 2001 general elections, but received just 230 votes and failed to win a seat. It did not contest any further elections.  The party satirised the political system in which politicians use rum and chicken to attract voters.  The STAFF Party symbol was a rum bottle.

References

Joke political parties
Political parties in Saint Lucia